Angelo Caro Narvaez (born 27 August 1999) is a Peruvian skateboarder.  He competed in the men's street event at the 2020 Summer Olympics.

Major results
2014
 DC Pro National Champion
 Sk8session National Champion
 Nike Champs National Champion 
2015   
 2nd Red Bull Skate Arcade - Portugal
 5th Grind for Life - United States
2016  
 9th Tampa Am – United States  
2017  
 12th Damn Am New York – United States  
 Pan American National Champion - Colombia
2018  
 3rd Tampa Am – United States 
 11th Damn Am Chicago – United States   
 6th WCS Green Anger – Austria  
 6th WCS Mystic Sk8 Cup – Czech Republic 
 5th Rey de Reyes - Chile 
2019  
 Nass Festival Invitational Skate Champion – England 
 WCS Mystic Sk8 Cup Champion – Czech Republic 
 Barcelona European Open Champion - Spain  
 3rd WCS Far´n High - France   
 3rd WCS O’Marisquino - Spain 
 6th World Skate OI STU Open – Brazil 
 7th World Skate SLS Super Crown World Championship – Brazil  
 Semifinals World Skate Street League Pro Tour – United States   
 8th World Skate London - England 
2020  
 5th Rey de Reyes - Chile  12th Tampa Pro – United States   
 Perú National Champion
 12th Tampa Pro - United States 
2021  
 14th Dew Tour – United States 
 5th 2020 Summer Olympics.
2022
 Urban World Series Champion - España

References

1999 births
Living people
Olympic skateboarders of Peru
Peruvian skateboarders
People from Chiclayo
Skateboarders at the 2020 Summer Olympics
21st-century Peruvian people